Robbinsville is a census-designated place (CDP) located within Robbinsville Township (known as Washington Township until 2007) in Mercer County, New Jersey, United States. The area is served as United States Postal Service ZIP Code 08691. As of the 2010 United States Census, the population for the CDP was 3,041.

The CDP includes the area of the township developed as a part of the Robbinsville Town Center. The CDP also includes the largely undeveloped land bordered by the Hamilton Township border, U.S. Route 130, and New Jersey Route 33 though there are some plans to develop this area as well.

Geography
According to the United States Census Bureau, the CDP had a total area of 0.759 square miles (1.966 km2), including 0.757 square miles (1.961 km2) of it is land and 0.002 square miles (0.005 km2) of water (0.26%) is water.

Demographics

Census 2010

References

Census-designated places in Mercer County, New Jersey
Robbinsville Township, New Jersey

simple:Robbinsville, New Jersey